Dominique Ottato (born 6 August 1968) is a French football manager and former player who played as a defender. He was most recently the head coach of French club Sisteron FC.

Notes

References 

1968 births
Living people
Sportspeople from Vosges (department)
French footballers
Association football defenders
INF Vichy players
OFC Charleville players
Gap HAFC players
French Division 3 (1971–1993) players
Ligue 2 players
Division d'Honneur players
Championnat National 3 players
French football managers